Blandina Segale, more commonly known as Sister Blandina (23 January 1850 – 23 February 1941) was an Italian-born American Sister of Charity of Cincinnati and missionary, who became widely known through her service on the American frontier in the late 19th century. During her missionary work, she met, among others, Billy the Kid and the leaders of the Native American tribes of the Apache and Comanche. She served as an educator and social worker who worked in Ohio, Colorado and New Mexico, assisting Native Americans, Hispanic settlers and European immigrants.

The Roman Catholic Archdiocese of Santa Fe has opened a process to canonize Segale, for which it has received the permission of the Holy See. For this, she is honored by the Catholic Church with the title of Servant of God. She is the first individual in New Mexico's 400-year history with the Roman Catholic Church to have a cause opened by any diocese or archdiocese located in New Mexico for their beatification and canonization.  Venerable Alphonse Gallegos, whose cause for canonization in 2005 was opened by the Diocese of Sacramento, was born in Albuquerque, New Mexico.

Life
She was born Rosa Maria Segale in 1850 in Cicagna, Genoa, then part of the Kingdom of Sardinia. She emigrated at age four with her family to the United States, where they settled in Cincinnati, Ohio. She had felt called from an early age to join the Sisters of Charity of Cincinnati. She did so at the age of sixteen, when she was clothed in the habit of the Sisters and given the religious name of Sister Blandina, in memory of St. Blandina, martyred in 177 during the reign of Marcus Aurelius. On December 8, 1868, she completed the novitiate and professed religious vows for the first time.  Her sister, Maria Maddelena, decided to follow her younger sister's example, and also joined the Sisters of Charity, where she was given the name of Sister Justina.

Segale was sent to teach in the schools of Steubenville and Dayton. It was there that she received notice on 27 November 1872, at the age of twenty-two years, she was being sent as serve as a missionary in Trinidad. At first thinking she was being sent to the Caribbean, she soon learned that her assignment was in Trinidad, Colorado, where the Sisters of Charity of Cincinnati had recently opened a mission.

She was later transferred to Santa Fe, where she co-founded public and Catholic schools throughout the area. During her time in New Mexico, she worked with the poor, the sick and immigrants. She also advocated on behalf of Hispanics and Native Americans who were losing their land to swindlers.

Segale traveled alone on dusty trails and railroads, through the unexplored lands of the far Southwest, finally reaching Trinidad, a frontier mining town, on December 9, 1872. After opening a school almost alone, her first action was to fight against the common practice of lynching. She came to learn from one of her students that a member of the gang led by the famed outlaw Billy the Kid had been seriously wounded, and had been left alone to die in a shack. She immediately went to him and, as she examined the wound, spoke harshly to his persecutors saying, "I see that with a hard head that you find yourself not able to kill him with one shot to the head." Without another word, she treated the bandit and saved the man's life.

In December 1873, Segale received a letter from her Mother Superior directing her to move to Santa Fe, New Mexico to help in the religious settlement. Despite the scarcity of funding and resources, she built several schools and orphanages, continued to visit the mines in the area and railway construction sites to minister to the people there. She managed to collect funds for the construction of St. Vincent Hospital and for the care of indigent. She visited and took care of Billy the Kid and other prisoners confined in the main prison in New Mexico.

In 1882, Segale was charged with the reconstruction of the Sisters' dilapidated convent in Albuquerque, New Mexico. She also attempted at building a hospital there but was recalled in 1889 to Trinidad, where she defended the right of the Sisters of Charity to teach in the local school while wearing their religious habit. However, anti-Catholic prejudice prevailed and she was forced to return to Albuquerque where, in 1901, she completed the construction of St. Joseph Hospital.

Segale returned to Cincinnati, where she worked with her sister for the Italian immigrant community until her death at the age of 91, on February 23, 1941.

Legends
In 1875, Segale helped Morris James, a man convicted of murder in Trinidad on 3 July 1875, receive forgiveness from the man he shot and protected him from a mob. James was later pardoned and admitted to a "lunatic asylum" in April 1876. James's daughter wrote to Sister Blandina years later in Cincinnati and thanked her for her "loving, dauntless, courageous heart."

Segale's encounters with Old West outlaws later became the stuff of legend and were the subject of an episode of the CBS series Death Valley Days. The episode, called The Fastest Nun in the West, focused on her efforts to save a man from a lynch mob.

According to one story, she received a tip that Billy the Kid was coming to her town to scalp the four doctors who had refused to treat his friend's gunshot wound. Segale nursed the friend to health, and when Billy came to Trinidad, Colorado, to thank her, she asked him to abandon his violent plan. He agreed.

Another story says Billy the Kid and his gang attempted to rob the covered wagon in which she was traveling on the frontier. When he looked inside, he saw Segale. At that, Billy the Kidd simply tipped his hat and rode off in deference to her safety and the debt he owed her.

Many of the tales were recorded in letters Segale wrote to her sister, and which were later published in a book entitled At the End of the Santa Fe Trail.

Path to sainthood
Sister Blandina was the inspiration for a new direction for the CHI St. Joseph's Children Catholic charity in Albuquerque, NM. The organization focuses on funding women to make home visits to low-income mothers and babies. Allen Sánchez and members of the charity were the first supporters for Blandina's sainthood. The "cause" was officially opened on 29 June 2014. On 25 August 2015, supporters and researchers presented their case before the Archdiocese of Santa Fe at a ceremonial “first inquiry” in Albuquerque on why Sister Blandina Segale should become a saint. The public inquiry, headed by the former Archbishop of Santa Fe Michael Jarboe Sheehan, was aimed at determining if there was enough evidence to move her case through the largely secret process through the Vatican. Segale is the first person in New Mexico's over 400-year history to be vetted for sainthood. Peso Chavez, a private investigator was hired to help make the case.

Correspondence
Segale's experiences in areas east of the Rio Grande and south of the Sangre de Cristo Mountains (in Santa Fe County, New Mexico) were told through her diary At the End of the Santa Fe Trail, first published by Columbian Press in 1932, reprinted by Bruce Publishing, Milwaukee, Wisconsin, 1948). The book was based on the letters she exchanged with her sister Justine, who was also a religious sister in Ohio, with whom she enjoyed a long letter-writing relationship (the book was published in Italy in the mid-nineties with the title An Italian Nun in the West.)

Quotes
Segale fought against the injustices committed against the Native Americans and supported their civil rights; she wrote: "Poor wild hearts, how they feel full of anger and treated unfairly."

In her letters, Segale referred to Billy the Kid: "His eyes were blue-gray, rosy complexion, and the air of a little boy... [looking no] more than seventeen years. He was an innocent, if not for the iron firmness of purpose, good or bad, that we read in the corner of my eye;... could choose the right path and instead chose the wrong."

When she learned of his death, she noted: 
"Poor Billy the Kid, thus ending the career of a young man who started down the slope at the age of twelve to avenge an insult that had been done to his mother."

Knowledge of Sister Blandina
Most of the research about Segale was undertaken by her religious congregation and by the Library of Cicagna, the small town in the Fontanabuona Valley from which her family originated. She was known as the Nun with spurs. Necessary, it was also busy with its own article to the newspaper the Port Informer Genoa.

In June 2003, it was co-starred in the episode of Magic Wind titled "Jericho", and was dedicated to the item in the Blizzard Gazette of that number. In the post # 74 (Niagara Falls, August 2003), Gianfranco Manfredi, series creator and curator of the categories, says that the story of Sister Blandina had generated a lot of interest from readers, many of whom demanded his return.

Segale was portrayed in two episodes of the syndicated western television series, Death Valley Days. The first was the 1966 episode "The Fastest Nun in the West", hosted by Ronald W. Reagan. Julie Sommars portrayed the Sister as she sought justice for a killer, despite heavy sentiment for his hanging. In the 1967 episode "Lost Sheep in Trinidad", Mariette Hartley played Sister Blandina. She aids a seriously wounded outlaw that tells her of his friend and avenger, Billy the Kid.

References

External links
Sister Blandina Segale, SC official site

1850 births
1941 deaths
19th-century venerated Christians
20th-century venerated Christians
American letter writers
Women letter writers
American Roman Catholic missionaries
20th-century American Roman Catholic nuns
Schoolteachers from Ohio
American Servants of God
Daughters and Sisters of Charity of St. Vincent de Paul
Female Roman Catholic missionaries
Italian emigrants to the United States
People from the Kingdom of Sardinia
Roman Catholic missionaries in the United States
Writers from Cincinnati
American women non-fiction writers
American women educators